Small Planet Airlines GmbH was a German charter airline headquartered in Berlin and a subsidiary of now-defunct Small Planet Airlines from Lithuania.

History
The airline was founded in 2015 and operated its first charter services out of Düsseldorf Airport using its parent's licence by October 2015. Along with its owner, Small Planet Airlines from Lithuania, which owns 80% of the German airline, and sister airline Small Planet Airlines (Poland), it belonged to the Small Planet Group. The headquarters in Berlin is expected to have up to 15 employees while each aircraft will be operated by 5 crews of 6; together that gives an expected overall employee count of around 75.

The airline received its own German operations license on 13 May 2016 and operated its first flight (Bremen to Heraklion) on the same day. In January 2018, Small Planet Airlines Germany welcomed its one-millionth passenger.

On 18 September 2018 Small Planet Airlines Germany filed for bankruptcy while planning to continue its operations during a restructuring. Shortly after, TUI announced plans to replace their charter operations at Paderborn Lippstadt Airport with services operated by TUI fly Deutschland with more takeovers to be likely. Shortly after, Small Planet lost the operations for TUI from Leipzig Halle Airport as well, this time to Germania.

On 31 October 2018, Small Planet Airlines Germany ceased all operations and returned most of the aircraft to their lessors while its parent company still negotiated the sale of its remaining assets. In November 2018, these were planned to be bought up by SF Aviation Holding which also owns VLM Airlines Brussels, however shortly after this deal fell through. On 28 November 2018 it was announced that Small Planet Airlines Germany had declared bankruptcy.

Destinations
Since May 2016, the company operated charter flights to various Southern European leisure destinations from its bases on behalf of travel groups like Thomas Cook and TUI.

Fleet

As of May 2018, Small Planet Airlines GmbH operated the following aircraft:

References

External links

Official website

Defunct airlines of Germany
Airlines established in 2015
Airlines disestablished in 2018
2015 establishments in Germany
German companies disestablished in 2018
German companies established in 2015
Defunct charter airlines